Kyrgyzstan competed at the 2018 Winter Olympics in Pyeongchang, South Korea, from 9 to 25 February 2018. The team, announced on January 10, 2018, consisted of two male athletes, one competing in alpine skiing and the other in cross-country skiing.

Competitors
The following is the list of number of competitors participating in the delegation per sport.

Alpine skiing 

Kyrgyzstan qualified one male alpine skier, Evgeniy Timofeev. Timofeev also was the only athlete to represent the country four years prior, as a last minute injury substitute.

Cross-country skiing 

Kyrgyzstan qualified one male cross-country skier, Tariel Zharkymbaev.

Sprint

See also
Kyrgyzstan at the 2017 Asian Winter Games
Kyrgyzstan at the 2018 Summer Youth Olympics

References

Nations at the 2018 Winter Olympics
2018
2018 in Kyrgyzstani sport